Skelton Township is one of ten townships in Warrick County, Indiana, United States. As of the 2010 census, its population was 1,625 and it contained 635 housing units.

History
Skelton Township was organized in about 1820. The township was named for Zachariah Skelton, a local judge.

Geography

Cities, towns, villages
 Tennyson

Unincorporated towns
 Ash Iron Springs at 
 De Gonia Springs at 
 Eames at 
(This list is based on USGS data and may include former settlements.)

Adjacent townships
 Pigeon Township (northeast)
 Jackson Township, Spencer County (east)
 Grass Township, Spencer County (southeast)
 Boon Township (west)
 Owen Township (northwest)

Cemeteries
The township contains these eight cemeteries: Clark, Garrison, Kelley, Mill, Polk, Polk, Reed, Roth and Skelton.

School districts
 Warrick County School Corporation

Political districts
 Indiana's 8th congressional district
 State House District 74
 State Senate District 47

References
 United States Census Bureau 2007 TIGER/Line Shapefiles
 United States Board on Geographic Names (GNIS)
 IndianaMap

External links
 Indiana Township Association
 United Township Association of Indiana

Townships in Warrick County, Indiana
Townships in Indiana